Sodium aluminate is an inorganic chemical that is used as an effective source of aluminium hydroxide for many industrial and technical applications. Pure sodium aluminate (anhydrous) is a white crystalline solid having a formula variously given as NaAlO2, NaAl(OH)4 (hydrated), Na2O·Al2O3, or Na2Al2O4. Commercial sodium aluminate is available as a solution or a solid.
Other related compounds, sometimes called sodium aluminate, prepared by reaction of Na2O and Al2O3 are Na5AlO4 which contains discrete AlO45− anions, Na7Al3O8 and Na17Al5O16 which contain complex polymeric anions, and NaAl11O17, once mistakenly believed to be β-alumina, a phase of aluminium oxide.

Structure
Anhydrous sodium aluminate, NaAlO2, contains a three-dimensional framework of corner linked AlO4 tetrahedra. The hydrated form NaAlO2·5/4H2O has layers of AlO4 tetrahedra joined into rings and the layers are held together by sodium ions and water molecules that hydrogen bond to O atoms in the AlO4 tetrahedra.

Manufacturing
Sodium aluminate is manufactured by the dissolution of aluminium hydroxide (Al(OH)3) in a caustic soda (NaOH) solution. Aluminium hydroxide (gibbsite) can be dissolved in 20–25% aqueous NaOH solution at a temperature near the boiling point. The use of more concentrated NaOH solutions leads to a semi-solid product. The process must be carried out in steam-heated vessels of nickel or steel, and the aluminium hydroxide should be boiled with approximately 50% aqueous caustic soda until a pulp forms. The final mixture has to be poured into a tank and cooled; a solid mass containing about 70% NaAlO2 then forms. After being crushed, this product is dehydrated in a rotary oven. The resulting product contains 90% NaAlO2 and 1% water, together with 1% free NaOH.

Reaction of aluminium metal and alkali
Sodium aluminate is also formed by the action of sodium hydroxide on elemental aluminium which is an amphoteric metal. The reaction is highly exothermic once established and is accompanied by the rapid evolution of hydrogen gas. The reaction is sometimes written as:
 2Al + 2NaOH + 2H2O → 2NaAlO2 + 3H2
However, the species produced in solution is likely to contain the [Al(OH)4]− ion or perhaps the [Al(H2O)2(OH)4]− ion.

Uses
In water treatment it is used as an adjunct to water softening systems, as a coagulant aid to improve flocculation, and for removing dissolved silica and phosphates.

In construction technology, sodium aluminate is employed to accelerate the solidification of concrete, mainly when working during frost.

Sodium aluminate is also used in the paper industry, for fire brick production, alumina production and so forth.

Sodium aluminate solutions are intermediates in the production of zeolites.

References

See also
 Bayer process
 Bauxite

Aluminates
Sodium compounds